Astra Sharma and Aldila Sutjiadi defeated Emina Bektas and Tara Moore in the final, 4–6, 6–4, [11–9], to win the doubles tennis title at the 2022 Copa Colsanitas. The win earned Sharma her second Copa Colsanitas doubles title after first winning in 2019, and Sutjiadi her first career Women's Tennis Association (WTA) title.

Elixane Lechemia and Ingrid Neel were the defending champions, but lost in the first round to Camila Osorio and Beatriz Haddad Maia.

Seeds

Draw

Draw

References

External links
Main draw

Copa Colsanitas - Doubles
2022 Doubles